Darul Makmur Stadium is a multi-purpose stadium located in Kuantan, Pahang, Malaysia. It is mostly use for football matches, with a capacity of 40,000 people. The stadium has a running track, in addition to the football field. It was opened in 1970, while capacity was increased after renovations in 1995 in conjunction with Kuantan hosting the Sukma Games in 1996 and 2012.

See also 
 Sport in Malaysia

References 

Football venues in Malaysia
Kuantan
Athletics (track and field) venues in Malaysia
Sports venues in Pahang
Multi-purpose stadiums in Malaysia
Tourist attractions in Pahang
1970 establishments in Malaysia
Sri Pahang FC